was a Japanese actor who, in a career lasting more than 50 years, appeared in over 400 television shows, nearly 250 films and numerous stage productions. He is best known in the West for his roles in films by Akira Kurosawa, such as Seven Samurai (1954) and Yojimbo (1961), and films by Yasujirō Ozu, such as Tokyo Story (1953) and An Autumn Afternoon (1962). He also appeared in Kill! by Kihachi Okamoto and Tora! Tora! Tora!, a depiction of the Japanese attack on Pearl Harbor. His final film was Juzo Itami's A-ge-man (Tales of a Golden Geisha) in 1990. Tōno also starred as the title character in the long-running television jidaigeki series Mito Kōmon from 1969 to 1983. In the early years of his career he acted under the name of  Katsuji Honjo (本庄克二).

Early life 
Eijirō Tōno was born on 17 September 1907 in Tomioka City, Gunma Prefecture, Japan. Born to a sake brewery, his father was a Hino merchant (Ōmi merchant), who had moved to Kantō alone from a mountain village in Ōmi Province and worked his way to become a sake brewer from the ground up. Tōno attended Tomioka Middle School. After enrolling as a student in the Commerce Department of Meiji University he joined the left-wing Society for the Study of Social Science (社会科学研究会 : Shakai-kagaku kenkyukai ). This was politically dangerous, as the Peace Preservation Law of 1925 made members of any association whose object was the alteration of the kokutai (National Polity), or of the system of private property, liable to imprisonment for up to ten years. In 1931 he became a student on the proletarian drama course run by the Tsukiji Little Theatre (築地小劇場: Tsukiji shogekijo ). He made his stage debut in the Tokyo Left-wing Theatre (東京左翼劇場: Tokyo sayoku gekijo ) production of The Mount Osore Tunnel (恐山トンネル: Osoreyama tonneru)by Jūrō Miyoshi. Having completed the proletarian drama course, he joined the New Tsukiji Theatre Group and took the stage name Katsuji Honjō (本庄克二).

Career 
Through the 1930s, Tōno appeared in almost all of the New Tsukiji Theatre Group's productions, receiving favourable reviews. In particular, his performances as Heizō in Earth (土: Tsuchi), Yugorō in The Composition-writing Classroom （綴方教室: Tsuzurikata kyōshitsu） and the Gravedigger in Hamlet established his reputation as an actor. He also came to play an important part in the management of the troupe. In 1936, he made his film debut in Older Brother, Younger Sister （兄いもうと: Ani imōto）. In 1938 he appeared in Teinosuke Kinugasa's Kuroda seichū roku （黒田誠忠録）and subsequently had roles in pictures for the Shōchiku, Nikkatsu and Tōhō studios. Up to this point, he was credited under his stage name, 'Katsuji Honjō'.

In August 1940 the New Tsukiji Theatre Group was forcibly disbanded. From this time on, he was credited as 'Tōno Eijirō'. In 1943 he appeared in Keisuke Kinoshita's debut film Port of Flowers （花咲く港: Hana saku minato）. In 1944 Tōno, Eitarō Ozawa, Koreya Senda, Sugisaku Aoyama, Chieko Higashiyama and others formed the Actors' Theatre Haiyuza. During the last year of the Pacific War, he toured Japan under the auspices of the Japan Peripatetic Drama League （日本移動演劇連盟）, an officially-sponsored body whose remit was to raise morale, and therefore productivity, by bringing drama to factories, mines, farming communities and fishing villages.

After the war ended in August 1945, Tōno returned to the Actors' Theatre as one of its central figures, both actor and administrator.  Between the end of the war and 1990 he also played supporting roles in well over 200 films. Notable among them were seven films for Akira Kurosawa, including Seven Samurai and Yojimbo, four for Yasujirō Ozu, including Tokyo Story and An Autumn Afternoon, and nine for Keisuke Kinoshita, including Marriage （結婚: Kekkon） and The Ballad of Narayama.

He also voiced Doc in the 1958 Japanese dub of Snow White and the Seven Dwarfs (1937 film).

The role for which he is perhaps best remembered in Japan, however, is that of the title character in the hugely popular TV jidaigeki Mito Kōmon, in which the historical Tokugawa Mitsukuni, retired daimyō of the Mito Domain, roams the country in the guise of a retired merchant, Mitsuemon, righting wrongs and correcting injustice with the aid of two samurai retainers. Tōno played the role in 381 episodes between 1969 and 1983. (The series continued through 2011, with four further actors playing Mitsuemon.)

Tōno died of heart failure on 8 September 1994, nine days before his 87th birthday. He was 86 years old.

Selected filmography 

 Older Brother, Younger Sister (1936) as A laborer (uncredited)
 Port of Flowers (1943) as Hayashida
 Kaigun (1943)
 Kanko no machi (1944)
 Army (1944) as Sakuragi
 Izu no musumetachi (1945) as Murakami
 Morning for the Osone Family (1946) as Ippei Yamaki
 Kekkon (1947) as Kōhei, Fumie's father
 Tsukinode no ketto (1947)
 Joyū Sumako no koi (1947) as Shoyo Tsubouchi
 Natsukashi no buruusu (1948)
 Jutai (1948)
 Taifuken no onna (1948) as Yoshii
 The Broken Commandment (1948)
 Waga Koi wa Moenu (1949) as State Councillor Ito
 Shin'ya no kokuhaku (1949)
 Mahiru no embukyoku (1949) as Sampei Kuribayashi
 Stray Dog (1949) as Old man of wooden tub shop
 Rinchi (1949)
 Ma no ogon (1950)
 Akagi Kara kita otoko (1950)
 Les Miserables (1950)
 Sasaki Kojiro (1950)
 Zoku Sasaki Kojiro (1951)
 Ginza Cosmetics (1951) as Hyôbei Sugano
 Jiyû gakkô (1951)
 Hopu-san: sararîman no maki (1951)
 Kanketsu Sasaki Kojirô: Ganryû-jima kettô (1951) as Jinnai Ôba
 Sekishun (1952) as Sakichi Arakawa
 Yamabiko gakkô (1952)
 Sengoku burai (1952)
 Children of Hiroshima (1952)
 Bijo to touzoku (1952) as Jurota
 Muntinlupa no yo wa fukete (1952)
 Himitsu (1952) as Jonosuke Tajima
 Fuun senryobune (1952)
 Jûdai no seiten (1953) as Tomekichi, Fusae's father
 Asama no karasu (1953) as Hyakusuke no Onoji
 Hiroba no kodoku (1953) as Soneda
 Hana no naka no musumetachi (1953) as Shôroku Ishii
 The Wild Geese (1953) as Suezô, the moneylender
 Waseda daigaku (1953) as Nomura
 Shishun no izumi (1953) as Nakamura, a policeman
 Tokyo Story (1953) as Sanpei Numata
 Life of a Woman (1953) as Kyuzaemon
 Seven Samurai (1954) as Thief
 The Sound of Waves (1954) as Schoolmaster, a peddler
 Taiyo no nai machi (1954)
 Midori no nakama (1954) as Tamon Tsuburagi
 Nyonin no yakata (1954) as Inokawa
 Horafuki tanji (1954) as Policeman Iketani
 Kuroi ushio (1954)
 Kunsho (1954)
 Keisatsu nikki (1955)
 Koko ni izumi ari (1955)
 Ai no onimotsu (1955)
 Uruwashiki saigetsu (1955) as Imanishi's father
 Tasogare sakaba (1955) as Onizuka
 Wolf (1955)
 Samurai II: Duel at Ichijoji Temple (1955) as Baiken Shishido
 Ukikusa nikki (1955)
 Record of a Living Being (1955) as Old man from Brazil
 Shuzenji Monagatari (1955) as Hōjō Tokimasa
 Samurai III: Duel at Ganryu Island (1956) as Baiken Shishido
 Hanayome no tameiki (1956) as Tahei Kawamura
 Early Spring (1956) as Tokichi Hattori
 Hakusen midare kurokami (1956)
 Kyûketsu-ga (1956) as Tetsuzô Ibuki / Shunsaku Etô
 Farewell to Dream (1956) as Yôichi's father, Genkichi
 Hana no kyodai (1956)
 Byaku fujin no yoren (1956)
 Zenigata Heiji Torimono no Hikae: Hitohada Gumo (1956)
 Nonki fufu (1956)
 Mori wa ikiteiru (1956) as A waiting man
 Hadashi no seishun (1956) as Shiimbei Hayashi
 Anata kaimasu (1956) as Ogushi
 An Actress (1956) as Tadao Inoue
 Tsuyu no atosaki (1956)
 Night River (1956)
 Namida (1956)
 Kome (1957) as Sakuzo
 Ôban (1957) as Chaplin-San
 An Osaka Story (1957) as Ninpei Omiya
 Suzakumon (1957) as Tomofusa Kunokura, Yuhide's father
 Ninjitsu (1957) as Fugetsusai
 Untamed (1957)
 Snow Country (1957) as Keisuke Kiyama
 Hikage no musume (1957)
 Zoku Ôban: Fûun hen (1957) as Chaplin san
 The Lower Depths (1957) as Tomekichi the Tinker
 Jun'ai monogatari (1957) as Garbage man
 Kuroi kawa (1957) as Kurihara
 Dotanba (1957)
 Ninkyo shimisu-minato (1957) as Kansuke
 Boryoku no hatoba (1957)
 Yagyû bugeichô: Sôryû hiken (1958) as Fugetsusai
 Hotarubi (1958)
 Ankoru watto monogatari utsukushiki aishu (1958) as Chamberlain
 Yoru no tsuzumi (1958) as Mataemon Kurokawa
 The Ballad of Narayama (1958) as Messenger
 Kisetsufu no kanatani (1958)
 Oban kanketsu hen (1958)
 Wakai kemono (1958)
 Hitotsubu no mugi (1958)
 Zokuzoku sarariman shussetai kôki (1958)
 Kami no taisho (1958)
 Hadaka no taishô (1958) as Commander
 Jinsei gekijô - Seishun hen (1958)
 Shirasagi (1958)
 Akujo no kisetsu (1958) as Taisuke Yashiro
 Wakai kawa no nagare (1959) as Shôkichi Sone
 The Human Condition (1959)
 Dai san no shikaku (1959) as Kazuta Kubo
 Kiku to Isamu (1959) as Policeman
 Karatachi nikki (1959)
 Ohayo (aka Good Morning) (1959) as Tomizawa
 High Teen (1959) as Tateishi, principal
 Yajû shisubeshi (1959) as Detective Kawashima
 Naniwa no koi no monogatari (1959)
 Mi wa jukushitari (1959) as Saemon, Hikari's father
 Ningen no kabe (1959)
 The Three Treasures (1959) as Ootomo
 Futô no nâwabarî (1959)
 Shin santô jûyaku: Tabi to onna to sake no maki (1960)
 Ôinaru tabiji (1960)
 Chinpindô shujin (1960)
 Kunisada Chûji (1960) as Kansuke
 Ajisai no uta (1960) as Genjûrô Kurata
 Sake to onna to yari (1960) as Hideyoshi Toyotomi
 Shin santo juyaku: teishu kyo iku no maki (1960)
 Kenka Tarô (1960) as Kitaura
 Bokutô kitan (1960) as Teacher Yamai
 Ashita hareru ka (1960) as Seisaku Kajiwara
 Sararîman Chûshingura (1960) as Gonosuke Kira
 Ore no kokyô wa western (1960) as Ôkawa
 Tekkaba no kazê (1960)
 Botchan yaro seizoroi (1961)
 Pigs and Battleships (1961) as Kan'ichi
 Zoku sararîman Chûshingura (1961) as Gonosuke Kira
 Eddoko bugyo tenka o kiru otoko (1961)
 Yojimbo (1961) as Gonji - Tavern Keeper
 Tôshi reijô (1961) as Ginroku
 Ai to honoho to (1961) as Kudo
 The Littlest Warrior (1961) as Sanshô Dayû (voice)
 Kako (1961)
 Akai kôya (1961) as Shinzô Okui
 Immortal Love (1961) as Policeman
 Sekai daisensô (1961)
 Dôdôtaru jinsei (1961) as Daisaku Hara
 Buda (1961) as Suratha
 Hadakakko (1961) as Shohei, Akiko's father
 Kanpai! Gokigen yarou (1961)
 Taiheî hara no otoko (1961)
 Salary man Shimizu minato (1962) as Komazô Kuroda
 Zoku sararîman shimizu minato (1962)
 Watakushi-tachi no kekkon (1962)
 Musume to watashi (1962) as Grandfather
 Seinen no isu (1962) as Genjûrô Hatada
 Kyûpora no aru machi (1962) as Tatsugorô Ishiguro (Jun's father)
 Shachô yôkôki (1962)
 Nakayama shichiri (1962)
 Chiisakobe (1962) as Ikichi
 Akitsu Springs (1962) as Priest
 Ao beka monogatari (1962) as Grandpa Yoshi
 Shin no shikôtei (1962) as Li Tang
 An Autumn Afternoon (1962) as Seitarō Sakuma, "The Gourd"
 Kawa no hotori de (1962) as Tôgo Sawada
 Akai kage-bôshi (1962) as Jinzaburô Kamo
 Sen-hime to Hideyori (1962) as Tokugawa Ieyasu
 Hakone-yama (1962)
 Twin Sisters of Kyoto (1963) as Sosuke Otomo
 High and Low (1963) as factory worker
 Shiro to kuro (1963)
 Shitamachi no taiyô (1963) as Gensuke
 Kono kubi ichimangoku (1963) as Tenzen Ôshikôchi
 Bushido, Samurai Saga (1963) as Shibiku-Shosuke Hori
 Jinsei gekijo: zoku hisha kaku (1963)
 Kekkonshiki Kekkonshiki (1963) as Gorô
 Otoko no monshô (1963)
 Zoku shinobi no mono (1963) as Toyotomi Hideyoshi
 Kaigun (1963)
 Eden no umi (1963)
 Kureji sakusen: Kudabare! Musekinin (1963)
 Gobanchô yûgirirô (1963) as Kunigi
 The Elegant Life of Mr. Everyman (1963) as Meiji, his father
 Tange Sazen: zankoku no kawa (1963)
 Shin shinobi no mono (1963)
 Ukyonosuke Junsatsu-ki (1963)
 Hachigatsu umare no Onna (1963)
 Miyamoto Musashi: Ichijôji no kettô (1964) as Haiya
 Pale Flower (1964) as Gang Leader
 Hanayome wa jûgo sai (1964)
 Kizudarake no sanga (1964) as Shinzo Kozuki
 Echigo Tsutsuishi Oyashirazu (1964) as Endô
 Hadaka no jûyaku (1964) as Kosugi, president
 Horafuki taikôki (1964) as Koroku Hachisuka
 Otoko no monshô - fuun futatsu ryu (1964)
 Kûroi daîsu ga ore o yobû (1964)
 Dokonjô monogatari: Zuputo iyatsu (1964)
 Baka ga tanku de yatte kuru (1964)
 Aa, seishun no mune no chi wa (1964) as Sôtarô Shimizu
 Shachô ninpôchô (1965)
 Samurai Assassin (1965) as Masagorô Kisoya
 Red Beard (1965) as Goheiji
 Nippon ichi no goma suri otoko (1965)
 Muhômatsu no isshô (1965) as Jûzô Yûki
 Illusion of Blood (1965) as Priest
 Sword of the Beast (1965) as Minister
 Abashiri bangaichi: Bôkyô hen (1965)
 Akutô (1965) as Commentator
 Uzushio (1965)
 Supai (1965)
 An Innocent Witch (1965) as Mountain shaman
 Iki-ni kanzu (1965)
 Shachô gyôjôki (1966)
 Tobenai chinmoku (1966)
 Yojôhan monogatari: Shôfu Shino (1966) as Uyû
 Izuko e (1966)
 Yoidore hakase (1966) as Marshal
 Lost Sex (1966) as Neighbor / Writer
 Shiroi Kyotô (1966) as Professor Azuma (the first surgery dept)
 Yorû no bara o kesê (1966)
 Zatôichi tekka tabi (1967) as Senzo
 Kitaguni no ryojô (1967) as Kichinosuke Kawara
 Lost Spring (1967) as Soga
 Kureji no Kaitô Jibako (1967)
 Zoku ô-oku maruhi monogatari (1967) as Narrator (voice)
 Moero! Taiyô (1967)
 Waka oyabun senryû-hada (1967)
 Nippon ichi no otoko no naka no otoko (1967) as Gonosuke Okanda
 Kamo to negi (1968) as Shigejiro Ohno
 Teppô denraiki (1968) as Kinbei Yaita
 Kill! (1968) as Hyogo Moriuchi
 The Great Adventure of Horus, Prince of the Sun (1968) as Ganko, the blacksmith (voice)
 Âh himeyuri no tô (1968) as Nakaji, Principal
 Moero! Seishun (1968) as Zenkichi Misawa
 Otoko no chosen (1968)
 Fukushû no uta ga kikoeru (1968)
 Kureji no buchamukure daihakken (1969) as Onikuma
 Shachô enmachô (1969)
 Tirania (1969)
 Zoku shachô enmachô (1969)
 Zoku otoko wa tsurai yo (1969) as Sanpo Sensei
 Shachô gaku ABC (1970)
 Zoku shachô gaku ABC (1970)
 Fuji sanchō (1970)
 Tora! Tora! Tora! (1970) as Vice Admiral Chuichi Nagumo
 Tenkan no abarembo (1970)
 Shokon ichidai tenka no abarenbo (1970)
 Showa hito keta shachô tai futaketa shain (1971)
 Gekido no showashi: Okinawa kessen (1971)
 Zoku Showa hito keta shachō tai futaketa shain: Getsu-getsu kasui moku kinkin (1971)
 Gokumon-to (1977) as Kaemon Kitō - Yosamatsu's Father
 Mito Komon (1978) as Tokugawa Mitsukuni
 Hunter in the Dark (1979) as Shogen
 Eireitachi no oenka: saigo no sōkeisen (1979)
 Izakaya Chōji (1983) as Matukawa
 So What (1988)
 Death of a Tea Master (1989) as Kokei
 Harasu no ita hibi (1989)
 Ageman (1990) as Prime Minister

Honours
Medal with Purple Ribbon (1975)
Order of the Rising Sun, 4th Class, Gold Rays with Rosette (1982)

References

External links

Japanese male film actors
1907 births
1994 deaths
20th-century Japanese male actors
People from Gunma Prefecture
Recipients of the Medal with Purple Ribbon
Recipients of the Order of the Rising Sun, 4th class